Arencibia is a surname. Notable people with the surname include:

Gregorio Aldo Arencibia (born 1947), Cuban former cyclist
Humberto Arencibia (born 1989), Cuban freestyle wrestler
J. P. Arencibia (born 1986), Cuban-American baseball player
María Luisa Arencibia (born 1959), Venezuelan composer, organist and teacher
Mario Arencibia (born 1924), Cuban baseball player
Sadaise Arencibia (born c. 1981), Cuban ballet dancer
Walter Arencibia (born 1967), Cuban chess grandmaster
Yenima Arencibia (born 1984), Cuban sprint hurdler
Yordanis Arencibia (born 1980), Cuban judoka